A Guide to Heritage of Hyderabad: The Natural and the Built is a book on the heritage structures and buildings located in Hyderabad, Telangana, India. It is written by  Madhu Vottery. The book contains all the heritage structures and building like the Charminar, Golconda, Qutb Shahi Tombs, Chowmahalla Palace etc.

References

Books about India
Heritage structures in Hyderabad, India
2010 non-fiction books
Tourism in Hyderabad, India